Pseudonigrita is a genus of sparrow-like birds in the weaverbird family.

Extant Species
It contains two species, which are both found in eastern Africa:

Taxonomy 
French naturalist Charles Lucien Bonaparte described the grey-capped social weaver as Nigrita arnaudi in 1850, based on a specimen collected by the French explorer Joseph Pons d'Arnaud around 1841 near Juba on the White Nile. In 1884, the black-capped social weaver was first described by German East-Africa explorer Gustav Fischer and German ornithologist Anton Reichenow as Nigrita cabanisi, based on a specimen collected in 1883 by Fischer in the Pare Mountains. In 1903, Reichenow assigned both species to his newly erected genus Pseudonigrita, because he considered P. arnaudi and P. cabanisi related to weaverbirds (Ploceidae), while the other species Nigrita bicolor, N. canicapillus, N. fusconota and  N. luteifrons are negrofinches assigned to the estrildid finches. In 1942, Hans von Boetticher was of the opinion that cabanisi was different enough to assign it to its own genus, and made the new combination Somalita cabanisi.

Etymology 
Pseudonigrita:  pseudos “false”; genus Nigrita Strickland, 1843

Phylogeny 
Based on recent DNA-analysis (which did not include P. cabanisi), the genus Pseudonigrita belongs to the group of sparrow weavers (subfamily Plocepasserinae), and is most related to Philetairus socius. This clade is sister to Plocepasser. Provided that the sister relationship between the Pseudonigrita-species is correct, the following tree expresses current insights.

References

External links

 
Ploceidae
Bird genera
 
Taxonomy articles created by Polbot